Wollastonaria is a genus of gastropod molluscs in the subfamily Geomitrinae of the family Geomitridae.

Species
 † Wollastonaria beckmanni (De Mattia & Groh, 2018) 
 † Wollastonaria falknerorum (Groh, Neiber & De Mattia, 2018) 
 † Wollastonaria inexpectata (De Mattia & Groh, 2018) 
 Wollastonaria jessicae (De Mattia, Neiber & Groh, 2018)
 Wollastonaria klausgrohi (De Mattia & Neiber, 2018)
 Wollastonaria leacockiana (Wollaston, 1878)
 Wollastonaria oxytropis (R. T. Lowe, 1831)
 †Wollastonaria ripkeni (De Mattia & Groh, 2018) 
 † Wollastonaria subcarinatula (Wollaston, 1878)
 Wollastonaria turricula (R. T. Lowe, 1831)
 Wollastonaria vermetiformis (R. T. Lowe, 1855)

See also 
 List of gastropods described in 2018

References

External links 

Geomitridae
Gastropod genera